|}

The Rendlesham Hurdle is a Grade 2 National Hunt hurdle race in Great Britain which is open to horses aged four years or older. It is run at Haydock Park over a distance of about 3 miles and ½ a furlong (3 miles and 58 yards, or ), and during its running there are twelve hurdles to be jumped. The race is scheduled to take place each year in February.

The race was first run in 1980 and was initially held at Kempton Park.  It was a limited handicap from 1995 to 2001.

The race was transferred to Haydock in 2006, and its distance here was initially 2 miles and 7½ furlongs. It was extended to 3 miles in 2008, and then to 3 miles and 1 furlong for 2009 and 2010 before reverting to 3 miles in 2011 and being cut to 2 miles and 7 furlongs in 2012. It has been run at its present distance since 2019. The race is currently sponsored by William Hill and was run under various sponsored titles between 2010 and 2016.

The Rendlesham Hurdle serves as an important trial for the Stayers' Hurdle in March. The last horse to win both races in the same year was Baracouda in 2002.

Winners

See also
 Horse racing in Great Britain
 List of British National Hunt races

References
 Racing Post:
 Timeform Chasers & Hurdlers Statistical Companion 1992–93
 pedigreequery.com – Rendlesham Hurdle – Haydock.

National Hunt races in Great Britain
Haydock Park Racecourse
National Hunt hurdle races
Recurring sporting events established in 1980
1980 establishments in England